Oguchi (written: 小口 lit. "small mouth") is a Japanese surname. Notable people with the surname include:

, Japanese drummer
, Japanese businessman
, Japanese luger
, Japanese skeleton racer

Ōguchi, Ooguchi or Ohguchi (written: 大口 lit. "big mouth") is a separate Japanese surname, though it may be romanized the same way. Notable people with the surname include:

, Japanese musician and actor
, Japanese politician

Japanese-language surnames